The 2014 Drake Bulldogs football team represented Drake University as a member of the Pioneer Football League (PFL) during 2014 NCAA Division I FCS football season. Led by first-year head coach Rick Fox, the Bulldogs compiled an overall record of 7–4 with a mark of 6–2 in conference play, tying for third place in the PFL. The team played its home games at Drake Stadium in Des Moines, Iowa.

Schedule

References

Drake
Drake Bulldogs football seasons
Drake Bulldogs football